Gebr. Heller Maschinenfabrik GmbH is a German manufacturer of milling machines, manufacturing systems and crankshaft and camshaft machines. The company's headquarters is located in Nürtingen in the Stuttgart region of South Germany. The company's customers come from a variety of industries including automotive manufacturers and their suppliers, machine building industry, contract manufacturers, power engineering, tool and die manufacturing as well as aerospace companies.

History
On 7 February 1894, 25-year-old Herman Heller (1869–1931) founded the company „Hermann Heller Handelsgeschäft und Produktion von geschützten Artikeln und Uhrmacherwerkzeug“ – which traded and manufactured patented products and watchmaker's tools. Initially, staff comprised seven craftsmen and three apprentices. The company produced machinist vices, chimney cowls, fans and spiral stairs.

In 1898, the company entered the machine building industry by producing cold circular metal sawing machines and saw blade skiving machines as well as thread cutting machines. On 5 January 1900, the original company was superseded by „Gebr. Heller Maschinenfabrik GmbH“ founded by the brothers Ernst (1866–1936) and Hermann Heller.

In 1940, the company produced the first milling machines for the machining of crankshafts. In 1970, HELLER founded subsidiaries in the UK and Brazil. In 1982, HELLER opened production facilities in Chicago, IL in the United States.  In the year 2000, the company was awarded certification to ISO 9001, QS 9000, TES and VDA 6.4 standards. In the same year, HELLER doubled the production capacity of the company's production plant in the US and introduced a new internal milling machine for the machining of crankshafts.

In 2007, HELLER introduced the ModuleLine manufacturing system and presented the H series of machining centres at EMO in Hanover. In 2009, the company launched the F series for simultaneous 5-axis machining and in 2010 presented bevel gear machining on 5-axis machining centres from the MCH-C and F series. In 2013, HELLER together with Daimler AG was awarded with the German Innovation Award for Climate and Environment (IKU) for their arc spraying technology for the coating of cylinder surfaces in automobile engines. 

Today, HELLER is still a family-owned business. The descendants of Berndt Heller hold 100 percent of the shares in Heller Holding SE & Co. KGaA and are thus sole owners of the HELLER Group (as of October 2021).

Products
 4-axis machining centres from the H series
 5-axis machining centres from the HF and F series 
 Automation: automated manufacturing and production centres 
 Coating modules CBC 200 are used for coating cylinder bores in crankcases using CBC technology (CylinderBoreCoating) 
 5-axis machining centres for milling and turning operations from the C series
 Machines for crankshaft and camshaft machining of the RFK/DRZ/MCC 15/RFN series 
 Flexible manufacturing systems
 Training machine CNC-ProfiTrainer to train horizontal machining centre operators

Organisational structure
The HELLER Group operates production facilities around the globe, e.g. in Germany, UK, Brazil, United States and China. HELLER Services GmbH based in Nürtingen is a wholly owned subsidiary specialising in services and training. Additionally, HELLER is operating subsidiaries and representations in all relevant markets around the globe.

Recently, HELLER has been expanding its presence in the Asian market. Two examples are the TechnologyCenter in Pune/India founded in 2009 and the company's subsidiaries in Shanghai and Beijing. In 2013, a new production facility was opened in Changzhou, China.

References

Engineering companies of Germany
German brands
Machine tool builders
Companies based in Baden-Württemberg
Manufacturing companies established in 1894
German companies established in 1894